The Union League of America Hall is a site on the National Register of Historic Places located in White Sulphur Springs, Montana.  It was added to the Register on August 20, 1998.

In 1998 it was the First Presbyterian Church.  It has also been known as Diamond Lodge No. 5 of the Independent Order of Good Templars and as The First Church of White Sulphur Springs.

It was built in 1867 by a Union League and is a  building, on a concrete basement made in 1935.  It is "simple in form and with minimal adornment";  it "is a vernacular version of the Greek Revival Style. The front-gabled form, pedimented door and windows, and six-over-six sash provide links to the style. Additionally, the raised elevation of the front
imparts a subtle sense of monumentality to the building."

References

Clubhouses on the National Register of Historic Places in Montana
National Register of Historic Places in Meagher County, Montana
Greek Revival architecture in Montana
Buildings and structures completed in 1867
1867 establishments in Montana Territory